Xinchang may refer to:

 Xinchang County, a county of Zhejiang province, China.
 Xinchang River, a tributary of Cao'e River in Zhejiang province.
 Xinchang station, a station on Shanghai Metro Line 16.
 Xinchang, Jingzhou County, a town of Jingzhou Miao and Dong Autonomous County, Hunan Province.
 Xinchang Town, a town of Fenghuang County, Hunan province.